The 2015 Ashfield District Council election took place on 7 May 2015, to elect members of Ashfield District Council in England. This was on the same day as other local elections.

Overall election results

Ashfield District Council (Summary of Overall Results)
 

|}

Ashfield District Council - Results by Ward

Abbey Hill

Annesley & Kirkby Woodhouse

Ashfields

Carsic

Central & New Cross

Hucknall Central

Hucknall North

Hucknall South

Hucknall West

Huthwaite & Brierley

Jacksdale

Kingsway

Kirby Cross & Portland

Larwood

Leamington

Selston

Skegby

St Marys

Stanton Hill & Teversal

Summit

Sutton Junction & Harlow Wood

The Dales

Underwood

Changes between 2015 and 2019 
Christine Quinn-Wilcox (Selston Independents) retained a Selston seat for the Selston Independents in the 26 November 2015 by-election.

In November 2015 Independent Councillor Jason Zadrozny (Larwood), along with Liberal Democrats Councillors Tom Hollis (Ashfields), Rachel Madden (Annesley & Kirkby Woodhouse), Anthony Brewer (Skegby), Christian Chapman (Jacksdale) and Helen Smith (Stanton Hill & Teversal), formed the Ashfield Independents party.

These were joined by Beverly Gail Turner and Robert Sears-Piccavey (Underwood) to form the Ashfield Independents Group at Ashfield District Council. On the resignation of Beverly Gail Turner and election of Christine Quinn-Wilcox (Selston)

Further additions to the group, in April 2018 by former Labour Councillors Helen Hollis (The Dales), Glenys Maxwell (Huthwaite and Brierley), both sitting as independents, after a vote of no confidence in the then Labour Leader of the Council, Cheryl Butler

John Wilmott (Ashfield Independents) gained a Hucknall North seat from the Conservatives in the 12 October 2017 by-election.

On 20 March 2018 Labour councillors Lee Anderson (Huthwaite and Brierley) and Chris Baron (Hucknall West) changed affiliation to the Conservatives, and Steve Carroll (Sutton Junction and Harlow Wood) left Labour to sit as an Independent.

In April 2018 Labour Councillors Amanda Brown (Central and New Cross), Tim Brown (Central and New Cross) and Joanne Donnelly (Abbey Hill) left the Labour Group to sit as Independents.

As a result of the above changes on 26 April 2018 The Ashfield Independents along with the rest of the Independents Group, joined by the Conservatives, forced a vote of no confidence in the Labour leadership and replaced Labour leader Councillor Cheryl Butler with Jason Zadrozny of the Ashfield Independents.

As of 1 May 2018 the current make up of the Council is Labour 14 (-8), Ashfield Independents 11 (+11), Conservative Party 5 (+2), Independents 5 (+3) and Liberal Democrats 0 (-5).

References

2015 English local elections
May 2015 events in the United Kingdom
2015
2010s in Nottinghamshire